Jamie D. Pedersen (born September 9, 1968) is an American lawyer and politician serving as a member of the Washington State Senate, representing the 43rd district since 2013. A member of the Democratic Party, he previously served as a member of the Washington House of Representatives from 2007 to 2013.

Early life and education

Pedersen grew up in Puyallup, Washington and attended Puyallup High School. He graduated summa cum laude in American Studies from Yale and received his J.D. degree from Yale Law School. Pedersen was an active member of the Yale Russian Chorus while an undergraduate and law student, and remains active in the alumni of the Yale Russian Chorus. He clerked for Judge Stephen Williams on the U.S. Court of Appeals for the D.C. Circuit.

Career

Law practice

Pedersen joined Preston Gates & Ellis in 1995, working on corporate mergers. His pro bono work during this time focused on gay rights issues and he was Lambda Legal's lead attorney on the state's same-sex marriage case – Andersen v. King County. In 2012 he was hired by McKinstry, a Seattle-headquartered construction firm, as General Counsel.

Washington State Legislature

Pedersen was elected to the Washington House of Representatives from Washington's 43rd legislative district in downtown Seattle in 2006. He won a very competitive six-way Democratic primary election on September 19, 2006, with 23-percent of the vote. His nearest competitor, former Seattle City Council President Jim Street, was only 229 votes behind with 22-percent. The race was the most expensive House contest in Washington state history, with the six Democratic candidates raising almost $500,000 among them. His election campaign won the support of the Gay & Lesbian Victory Fund, which provided financial and strategic assistance. In the general election, he faced only nominal Republican opposition, defeating his opponent by a margin of more than four-to-one. He was re-elected unopposed in 2008, 2010 and 2012.

Pedersen was one of a number of Washington legislators who were briefly the subject of controversy in 2013 over expense claims uncovered in an Associated Press investigation. Pedersen had used $384 in tax funds to purchase art for his office; Pedersen explained that legislators receive an allowance for furnishing their offices and he had, typically, not used his entire allotment.

Political positions

Pedersen has been a supporter of increased firearms regulation in Washington. In 2013, he introduced legislation that would require private gun dealers to request a background check from a local law-enforcement agency.

In the legislature, Pedersen has been a key proponent for the replacement of the Evergreen Point floating bridge and has introduced legislation to block the state's department of transportation from capping spending on the project.

In 2012, Pedersen publicly endorsed both Washington Initiative 502 and Washington Referendum 74, which legalized the retail sale of marijuana and same-sex marriage, respectively.

In January 2020, Pedersen introduced a bill to mandate local school districts create individualized learning programs for students who are selected to participate in gifted programs before those programs are terminated.

Personal life

Pedersen is openly gay and is one of several LGBT members of the Washington State Legislature, alongside Sen. Marko Liias (D–Mukilteo) and Reps. Jim Moeller (D–Vancouver), Nicole Macri (D–Seattle), Christine Kilduff (D–University Place), Joan McBride (D–Kirkland), Laurie Jinkins (D–Tacoma) and Skyler Rude (R-Walla Walla).

Pedersen is married to Eric Cochran Pedersen, a high school assistant principal whom he met in 2004 while attending Seattle's Central Lutheran Church. Pedersen and his husband have four sons: Trygve Cochran Pedersen, and a set of triplets — Leif, Anders, and Erik (born 2009). The children were all given traditional Norwegian names by Pedersen, who has Norwegian descent.

References

External links 
 Elect Jamie Pedersen official campaign website
Washington State Legislature - Rep. Jamie Pedersen official WA House website
Project Vote Smart - Representative Jamie Pedersen (WA) profile
Follow the Money - Jamie D. Pedersen
 2008 campaign contributions

Democratic Party members of the Washington House of Representatives
1968 births
Living people
Gay politicians
LGBT state legislators in Washington (state)
Politicians from Seattle
Politicians from Puyallup, Washington
Democratic Party Washington (state) state senators
21st-century American politicians